Charles William Tingwell AM (3 January 1923 – 15 May 2009), known professionally as Bud Tingwell or Charles 'Bud' Tingwell, was an Australian film, television, theatre and radio actor. One of the veterans of Australian film, he acted in his first motion picture in 1946 and went on to appear in more than 100 films and numerous TV programs in both the United Kingdom and Australia.

Early life and military service
Tingwell was born in the Sydney suburb of Coogee, the son of William Harvey Tingwell and Enid (née Green). William volunteered as a surf lifesaver at Coogee Surf Life Saving Club where, in 1922, a colleague noticed Enid's pregnancy and asked, 'What's budding there?', and 'Bud' became the nickname for their infant son. As an adolescent, Bud was encouraged by his father to train as an accountant, but Tingwell failed the entrance exam.

While still at school, he became a cadet at Sydney radio station 2CH, soon becoming the youngest radio announcer in Australia.

World War II
In 1941, aged 18, Tingwell volunteered for war service overseas with the Royal Australian Air Force. Under the British Commonwealth Air Training Plan, personnel from Commonwealth air forces formed part of a joint training and assignment system. Consequently, Tingwell trained as a pilot in Canada during 1942. Despite damaging a Harvard training aircraft in August, he later qualified as a pilot and was commissioned as a pilot officer that December. He was posted to the Mediterranean Theatre and underwent operational training with No. 74 Operational Training Unit RAF, in British Palestine, and qualified to fly the Hawker Hurricane and Supermarine Spitfire.

In January 1944, he was posted to No. 680 Squadron RAF, a photo reconnaissance unit, and flew 75 sorties in Mosquitos and Spitfires during the Italian campaign. Other aircraft that Tingwell was qualified to fly included the Bristol Blenheim, Martin Baltimore, Bristol Beaufighter and Airspeed Oxford. He was promoted to flying officer in June 1943 and flight lieutenant in December 1944.

Towards the end of the war, Tingwell was transferred back to Australia. He was posted to No. 5 Operational Training Unit RAAF as a flying instructor in June 1945, and then in December 1945, after the war had ended, he was posted to No. 87 Squadron RAAF, flying photo-reconnaissance Mosquitoes, until his demobilisation in March 1946. His war service earned him the 1939–45 Star, Italy Star, Defence Medal, War Medal 1939–1945, and Australia Service Medal 1939–1945. Tingwell remained a reservist into the 1950s.

Post-war life and acting career

Australia
After returning to Australia, Tingwell married his childhood sweetheart, Audrey May Wilson. They were to have two children, Christopher and Virginia.

He joined Doris Fitton's Independent Theatre company and appeared on stage from the mid-1940s in such classics as The Little Foxes by Lillian Hellman and Jean Giraudoux's The Madwoman of Chaillot

In 1946, Tingwell was given his first film role, in Smithy, cast as an RAAF control tower officer – winning the role since he could supply his own RAAF uniform.

Tingwell had an excellent supporting role in Bitter Springs (1950), made by Ealing Studios with Chips Rafferty; Tingwell played Rafferty's bigoted son. He had a similar role in Kangaroo (1952), a Hollywood-financed film shot in Australia for 20th Century Fox. He then appeared in I Found Joe Barton (1952), the first TV show filmed in Australia.

Fox liked Tingwell's work in Kangaroo and invited him to Los Angeles to play the role of Lt. Harry Carstairs in The Desert Rats, in which he appeared opposite Chips Rafferty, James Mason and Richard Burton. They offered him a long-term contract but Tingwell turned it down because he wanted to return to Australia.

Tingwell played the lead in King of the Coral Sea (1954) alongside Rafferty. In 1954, he co-starred with Gordon Chater in Top of the Bill, the first of the famous satirical revues staged at Sydney's Phillip Street Theatre.

England
The Australian film and radio industry slumped with the advent of television and Tingwell decided to move to the UK. He used the opportunity of a role in Ealing's The Shiralee (1957), which was filmed in Australia and London. Tingwell travelled to England to complete his scenes and decided to stay.

The following year, he took on his first recurring television role, as Australian surgeon Alan Dawson in the live TV serial Emergency – Ward 10 and its film spin-off Life in Emergency Ward 10 (1959).

He had small roles in Ealing's Dunkirk (1958), then Bobbikins (1959), Cone of Silence (1960), and Tarzan the Magnificent (1960).

Tingwell played the role of Inspector Craddock in all four films of the Miss Marple series, starring Margaret Rutherford, from 1961 to 1964: Murder, She Said (1961), Murder at the Gallop (1963), Murder Most Foul (1964) and Murder Ahoy! (1964). For Hammer Films he appeared in The Secret of Blood Island (1964) and Dracula: Prince of Darkness (1966).

He had the lead in a TV series An Enemy of the State (1965).

In the late 1960s, he performed various minor voice roles for the Gerry Anderson "Supermarionation" TV series Thunderbirds and Captain Scarlet and the Mysterons, besides appearing in the first series of Catweazle.

In 1969 until the end of the play's run, he appeared as Robert Danvers in the long running farce There's a Girl in My Soup at the Comedy Theatre, London.

He was the recurring character of motel manager Kevin McArthur in Crossroads in the late 1960s and early 1970s. (Vincent Ball played McArthur in 1970–1973). He had a small role in Nobody Runs Forever (1968) with Rod Taylor.

Return to Australia
Tingwell appeared in many other films during his time in Britain, spending a total of 16 years as a "London Aussie". In 1973, he returned to Australia with his wife and children, and shortly after won the role of Inspector Reg Lawson in the long-running TV series Homicide. This was followed by small roles in a number of major Australian films, such as Breaker Morant (1980), Puberty Blues (1981) and All the Rivers Run (1983). He also played the recurring role of farmer Ted Campbell in the soap A Country Practice in the late 1980s and early 1990s and as the Narrator from The Flying Scotsman in Australia

Revival in popularity
Tingwell's career went through a quiet period during the late 1980s and early 1990s, until he took on the role of "Gramps" in "Charlie the Wonderdog", a recurring segment on The Late Show, in 1993. His role in The Late Show was later to win him a major role as lawyer Lawrence Hammill in the film The Castle (1997). He later stated that this role helped him to recover from the death of his wife the previous year.

After the success of The Castle, Tingwell's career underwent a revival during the late 1990s and early 2000s. This saw him take on small roles in the commercial films The Craic (1999) and The Dish (2000), and in the TV mini-series Changi, as well as the lead role in the romantic drama film Innocence (2000). Tingwell also had a recurring guest role in the soap opera Neighbours from 2000 to 2003, playing Henry O'Rourke. He had previously appeared in the soap in 1993 as Bert Willis. He appeared as John Conroy in the musical theatre production The Man from Snowy River: Arena Spectacular, which toured Australian capital cities twice during 2002.

In 2004, Tingwell published a memoir, Bud: A Life. In 2006, he launched his own website, which attracted 500 registered users in just over a week. On 5 October that year, he created his first blog. He continued to act regularly until his death, in a number of films and TV programmes including eight episodes of Bed of Roses that aired in 2010. Among his last appearances, he hosted both Celebrity Circus and 20 to 1 and appeared on a celebrity special of Temptation with his daughter, Virginia.

Honours

Tingwell was appointed a member of the Order of Australia in the Queen's Birthday Honours of June 1999.

Awards
Tingwell was inducted into the Logie Hall of Fame in 1994. In 2008, he was inducted into Australian Film Walk of Fame in honour of his career and achievements in film and television.

Death
Audrey Tingwell died in 1996. Bud Tingwell died in Melbourne, thirteen years later, from prostate cancer, on 15 May 2009. He was 86.  He was given a state funeral, which was held at St Paul's Cathedral, Melbourne, on 20 May.

Selected filmography

Film

 Come Up Smiling (1939) .... Man in Crowd (uncredited)
 Smithy (1946) .... Control Tower Officer (uncredited)
 Always Another Dawn (1948) .... Terry Regan
 Into the Straight (1949) .... Sam Curzon
 Bitter Springs (1950) .... John King
 The Glenrowan Affair (1951) .... Narrator (voice)
 Kangaroo (1952) .... Matt
 I Found Joe Barton (1952, Short) .... Al Munch
 The Desert Rats (1953) .... Lieutenant Harry Carstairs
 King of the Coral Sea (1953) .... Peter Merriman
 Captain Thunderbolt (1953) .... Alan Blake
 Smiley (1956) .... Mr Stevens
 The Shiralee (1957) .... Jim Muldoon
 Dunkirk (1958) .... Sergeant in Cookhouse (uncredited)
 Life in Emergency Ward 10 (1959) .... Dr. Alan Dawson
 Bobbikins (1959) .... Luke Parker
 Cone of Silence (1960) .... Captain Braddock
 Tarzan the Magnificent (1960) .... Conway
 Murder, She Said (1961) .... Inspector Craddock
 Murder at the Gallop (1963) .... Inspector Craddock
 Murder Most Foul (1964) .... Inspector Craddock
 Murder Ahoy! (1964) .... Inspector Craddock
 The Secret of Blood Island (1964) .... Major Dryden
 Dracula: Prince of Darkness (1966) .... Alan Kent
 Thunderbirds Are Go (1966) .... Dr. Tony Grant (voice)
 Nobody Runs Forever (1968) .... Jacko
 Petersen (1974) .... Reverend Petersen
 End Play (1975) .... Dr. Fairburn
 Eliza Fraser (1976) .... Duncan Fraser
 Summerfield (1977) .... Dr. Miller
 Money Movers (1978) .... Jack Henderson
 The Journalist (1979) .... Sid Mitchell
 Breaker Morant (1980) .... Lt. Colonel Denny
 Puberty Blues (1981) .... The Headmaster
 Freedom (1982) .... Cassidy
 My First Wife (1984) .... Helen's Father
 Annie's Coming Out (1984) .... Judge
 Malcolm (1986) .... Tram Depot Supervisor
 Windrider (1986) .... Stewart Simpson Senior
 Bushfire Moon (1987) .... Max Bell
 Evil Angels (a.k.a. A Cry in the Dark) (1988) .... Justice James Muirhead
 The Flying Scotsman in Australia (1992) .... Narrator
 Shotgun Wedding (1993) .... Gary Judge (voice)
 The Castle (1997) .... Lawrence Hammill QC
 Amy (1997) .... Country Doctor
 The Craic (1999) .... Farmer
 The Wog Boy (2000) .... Mr. Walker
 Innocence (2000) .... Andreas Borg
 The Dish (2000) .... Reverend Loftus
 WillFull (2001) .... Martin
 The Inside Story (2002) .... Edward Brooks
 Ned Kelly (2003) .... Graham Berry
 Human Touch (2004) .... Anna's Step-father
 Laughing Stock (2005) .... Grandad
 Irresistible (2006) .... Sam
 Jindabyne (2006) .... Minister
 Three Blind Mice (2008) .... Bob
 Salvation (2008) .... Gallery Visitor
 Menzies and Churchill at War (2008, TV Movie) .... Sir Winston Churchill
 Remembering Nigel (2009) .... Himself

Television

 Emergency – Ward 10 (1957) .... Dr. Alan Dawson
 The Avengers "The Nutshell" (1963).... Mike Venner
 An Enemy of the State (1965) .... Harry Sutton
 Out of the Unknown ('The Counterfeit Man', episode) (1965) .... Captain Dantor
 Thunderbirds (1966) .... Various characters (voices)
 The Avengers "Return of the Cybernauts" (1967) .... Dr. Neville
 Captain Scarlet and the Mysterons (1967) .... Dr. Fawn, Captain Brown and others (voices)
 A Man of our Times (1968) .... David Soames
 Catweazle (1970) .... Mr. Bennet
 UFO (1970) .... Beaver James in "Mindbender"
 Homicide (1973-1976) .... Inspector Reg Lawson
 The Sullivans (1976) .... Dr. Hammond
 All the Rivers Run (1983 mini-series) .... Uncle Charles
 Prisoner (a.k.a. Prisoner: Cell Block H) (1985-1986) .... Dr. Massey (3 episodes, 1985) / Mr. Hudson (2 episodes, 1986)
 All the Rivers Run 2 (1989 mini-series) ... Uncle Charles
 The Late Show (1993) .... Gramps in "Charlie the Wonder Dog"
 Mother and Son (1994) .... The Judge
  The Silver Brumby (1998) .... Benni
 Round the Twist (2000) .... Derek
 Neighbours (2000-2003) .... Henry O'Rourke
 Changi (2001) .... David Colins (in old age)

Discography

Charting singles

References

External links

 
 Bud Tingwell at the National Film and Sound Archive
 "Tingwell Takes Off", Royal Australian Air Force News
 Obituary in The Daily Telegraph
 Obituary in The Independent

1923 births
2009 deaths
Military personnel from New South Wales
20th-century Australian male actors
21st-century Australian male actors
Male actors from Melbourne
Male actors from Sydney
Australian expatriate actors
Australian expatriates in the United Kingdom
Australian male film actors
Australian male musical theatre actors
Australian radio personalities
Australian male soap opera actors
Australian male stage actors
Australian male voice actors
Australian World War II pilots
Deaths from cancer in Victoria (Australia)
Deaths from prostate cancer
Logie Award winners
Members of the Order of Australia
People educated at Sydney Grammar School
People from the Eastern Suburbs (Sydney)
Radio and television announcers
Royal Australian Air Force officers
20th-century Australian male singers
Royal Australian Air Force personnel of World War II